Silent Cries and Mighty Echoes is the seventh studio album by German rock band Eloy, released in 1979. It is the third and last studio album with the line-up of Frank Bornemann, Detlev Schmidtchen, Klaus-Peter Matziol and Jürgen Rosenthal.

Track listing
Side One

Side Two

Personnel
 Frank Bornemann — lead, electric, processed and acoustic guitars, lead and backing vocals
 Detlev Schmidtchen — Hammond organ M3, backing vocals, Mini Moog and ARP synthesizers, Solina and String Ensembles, RMI keyboard computer, Fender Rhodes electric piano, Yamaha and Steinway grand pianos,
 Klaus-Peter Matziol — Alembic bass, backing vocals, Moog Taurus pedal, Two-Minutes-Effect guitar
 Jürgen Rosenthal — SONOR Genuine Rosewood 20" bass drum, 7,5x14" snare drum, Remo roto-toms, PAiSTe & Zildjian cymbals, gongs, kettle drums, percussion, flute, lyrics

Release Information
Gomah

References

External links 
 

 
 
 progweed.net review

1979 albums
Eloy (band) albums